This article lists important figures and events in Malaysian public affairs during the year 1968, together with births and deaths of notable Malaysians.

Incumbent political figures

Federal level
Yang di-Pertuan Agong: Sultan Ismail Nasiruddin Shah of Terengganu
Raja Permaisuri Agong: Tuanku Ampuan Intan Zaharah of Terengganu
Prime Minister: Tunku Abdul Rahman Putra Al-Haj
Deputy Prime Minister: Tun Abdul Razak
Lord President: Syed Sheh Hassan Barakbah then Mohamed Azmi Mohamed

State level
 Sultan of Johor: Sultan Ismail
 Sultan of Kedah: Sultan Abdul Halim Muadzam Shah (Deputy Yang di-Pertuan Agong)
 Sultan of Kelantan: Sultan Yahya Petra
 Raja of Perlis: Tuanku Syed Putra
 Sultan of Perak: Sultan Idris Shah
 Sultan of Pahang: Sultan Abu Bakar
 Sultan of Selangor: Sultan Salahuddin Abdul Aziz Shah
 Sultan of Terengganu: Tengku Mahmud (Regent)
 Yang di-Pertuan Besar of Negeri Sembilan:Tuanku Jaafar
 Yang di-Pertua Negeri (Governor) of Penang: Tun Syed Sheikh Barabakh
 Yang di-Pertua Negeri (Governor) of Malacca: Tun Haji Abdul Malek bin Yusuf
 Yang di-Pertua Negeri (Governor) of Sarawak: Tun Abang Haji Openg
 Yang di-Pertua Negeri (Governor) of Sabah: Tun Pengiran Ahmad Raffae

Events
17 January – The Radio Malaysia and Television Malaysia service were moved from Tunku Abdul Rahman multipurpose hall at Jalan Ampang to the new building at Angkasapuri.
8 April – Tuanku Jaafar was installed as the tenth Yang di-Pertuan Besar of Negeri Sembilan.
26 May – BERNAMA (Berita Nasional Malaysia) or Malaysian National News Agency established.
17 June – The Communist Party of Malaya launched an ambush of security forces in the area of Kroh–Betong road between Pengkalan Hulu town and the Malaysia-Thailand border, killing 17 members of the security forces. This event marked the start of the second armed revolt of the Communist Party of Malaya known as the Communist insurgency in Malaysia (1968–89). 
16 July – Protest about the Sabah sovereignty issue between Malaysia and Philippines
29 August – Natural Rubber Conference was held in Kuala Lumpur.
12–27 October – Malaysia competed at the 1968 Summer Olympics in Mexico City, Mexico. 31 competitors took part in four sports.

Births
2 May – Ziana Zain - Malay singer and actress
21 October – Emma Firyana Saroji - lawn bowler
24 November - Awie - Malaysia King of Rock, actor and host

Deaths
 12 July – Hassan Yunus, 10th Menteri Besar of Johor
 18 October – Abdul Rahman Talib, 3rd Minister of Education (Malaysia)

See also 

 History of Malaysia

References

 
Years of the 20th century in Malaysia
Malaysia
Malaysia
1960s in Malaysia